Fanny Juliet Passavant, FLA (16 October 1849 – 27 September 1944), was the first Librarian of the University of Leeds, in West Yorkshire, England, and of its predecessor the Yorkshire College. She was the only woman to hold a position of University Librarian when the college gained university status in 1904.

Biography
Born in 1849, Passavant was a member of a family of Huguenot refugees who settled in Basel and Geneva in the 16th century. Passavant was appointed in 1885 as the librarian of the Yorkshire College of Science. The college became the University of Leeds when it received a royal charter in 1904. Initially her role was expected to be clerical but Passavant worked on the cataloging and increasing the number of volumes. From an initial catalogue of about 4,000 books to the 85,000 the library contained when she retired Passavant's role became increasingly professional. Passavant joined the Library Association in 1903 becoming a Fellow later based on her experience and position.

Passavant retired in 1919. On 30 November 2021 Leeds Civic Trust erected a blue plaque to honour her memory, on the wall of the university's Great Hall building where the first university library had been located. The university's vice-chancellor, Professor Simone Buitendijk, said at the unveiling:

A lover of choral music, Passavant was a long time member of the Leeds Philharmonic Society choir and a committee member of the society as well as being a member of the Leeds Musical Festival choir.

Sources

1849 births
1944 deaths
British librarians
People associated with the University of Leeds
British women librarians
Academic librarians
Fellows of the Library Association